Fist Sized Chunks is the third studio album by the grunge band Skin Yard. It was released in 1990 on Cruz Records.

Track listing
 "Slow Runner"
 "Go to Sleep"
 "No Control"
 "Through Nothing"
 "Hungry and Hanging"
 "Ritual Room"
 "Over the Moon"
 "Drunk on Kerosene"
 "Gentle Collapse"
 "No Right" (CD only)

Fist Re-Mixed
In 2012 Jack Endino released a remixed version of the album with additional tracks.

Track listing
 "Slow Runner"
 "Go to Sleep"
 "No Control"
 "Through Nothing"
 "Hungry and Hanging"
 "Ritual Room"
 "Over the Moon"
 "Drunk on Kerosene"
 "Wither"
 "No Right"
 "Gentle Collapse"

Personnel
Jack Endino - Guitar
Daniel House - Bass
Ben McMillan - Vocals, bass
 Norman Scott - Drums, guitar
 Tom Accused - Guitar (on Slow Runner)
 Helios Creed - Guitar (on Gentle Collapse)

 Michael Lavine - Photography
 Lisa Orth - Artwork

References

External links
Information about Fist Sized Chunks

Skin Yard albums
1990 albums